= Jeremy Magruder =

American development economist

Jeremy R. Magruder

Academic background
- Education: Michigan State University (BA, 2002); Yale University (MA, MPhil, PhD, 2007)

Academic work
- Discipline: Development economics Agricultural economics
- Institutions: University of California, Berkeley
- Awards: George W. and Elsie M. Robinson Professorship (2022 – ) Junior Fellow, American Academy of Political and Social Science (2002 – 2003)
- Website: are.berkeley.edu/~jmagruder/

Jeremy R. Magruder is an American development economist and the George W. and Elsie M. Robinson Professor of Food and Agricultural Resource Economics at the University of California, Berkeley. He served as chair of Berkeley’s Department of Agricultural and Resource Economics (ARE) from 2022 through 2025. His research examines labor‑market frictions, social networks, and technology adoption in low‑income countries, with a particular focus on sub‑Saharan Africa and South Asia.

== Early life and education ==
Magruder earned a B.A. in economics with high honors from Michigan State University in 2002, where he received the Edward and Eleanor Carlin Award for outstanding achievement. He completed his graduate work at Yale University, obtaining an M.A. and M.Phil. in 2004 and a Ph.D. in economics in 2007. His dissertation, ‘‘Unemployment, AIDS, and Schooling Decisions in South Africa,’’ explored the links between labor markets and the HIV/AIDS epidemic.

== Academic career ==
Magruder joined UC Berkeley’s ARE faculty as an assistant professor in 2007, was promoted to associate professor in 2013, and to full professor in 2022. In 2022 he was appointed the endowed George W. and Elsie M. Robinson Professor, and in 2022 became department chair.

He is a Research Associate of the National Bureau of Economic Research (NBER), a Fellow of BREAD, and a J‑PAL affiliated professor. He has served as co‑editor of the Journal of Development Economics since 2016 and sits on the board of the Agricultural Technology Adoption Initiative (ATAI).

== Research ==
Magruder’s work combines empirical micro‑econometric methods with field experiments to study how information, networks, and market imperfections shape economic outcomes for workers and farmers in developing regions.

=== Selected publications ===
- ‘‘Factor Market Failures and the Adoption of Irrigation in Rwanda’’ (with Maria Jones, Florence Kondylis & John Loeser), American Economic Review, 112 (7): 2316–2352 (2022).
- ‘‘Can Network Theory‑Based Targeting Increase Technology Adoption?’’ (with Lori Beaman, Ariel Ben‑Yishay & Ahmed Mushfiq Mobarak), American Economic Review, 111 (6): 1918–1943 (2021).
- ‘‘Who Gets the Job Referral? Evidence from a Social Networks Experiment’’ (with Lori Beaman), American Economic Review, 102 (7): 3574–3593 (2012).
- ‘‘Learning from the Crowd: Regression Discontinuity Estimates of the Effects of an Online Review Database’’ (with Michael Anderson), Economic Journal, 122 (563): 957–989 (2012).

== Awards and honors ==
- George W. and Elsie M. Robinson Professorship, UC Berkeley (2022 – present).
- Junior Fellow, American Academy of Political and Social Science (2002 – 2003).
- Ryoichi Sasakawa Young Leaders Fellowship, Yale University (2004–2005).
- Russell Sage Foundation Small Grant in Behavioral Economics (2008).
- Edward and Eleanor Carlin Award, Michigan State University (2002).

== Media and public engagement ==
Magruder’s study with Michael Anderson showing that a half‑star increase in Yelp ratings boosts a restaurant’s likelihood of selling out by 19 percent attracted widespread media coverage, including features in Berkeley News and The Atlantic. He frequently advises governments and NGOs—such as the Rwandan Ministry of Agriculture and the World Bank—on policies to improve technology uptake and labor‑market efficiency.
